The Archdiocese of San José de Costa Rica is a Latin Church ecclesiastical territory or archdiocese of the Catholic Church in Costa Rica. A metropolitan see, there are seven suffragan dioceses in its ecclesiastical province: the Diocese of Alajuela, Cartago, Ciudad Quesada, Limón, Puntarenas, San Isidro de El General, and Tilarán. Erected on 28 February 1850, the Diocese of San José de Costa Rica was elevated to an archdiocese on 16 February 1921. It is the sole archdiocese in Costa Rica.

Bishops

Ordinaries
Anselmo Llorente y La Fuente (1851–1871)
Bernardo Augusto Thiel Hoffman (1880–1901)
Juan Gaspar Stork, C.M. (1904–1920)
Rafael Otón Castro Jiménez (1921–1939)
Víctor Manuel Sanabria Martínez (1940–1952)
Rubén Odio Herrera (1952–1959)
Carlos Humberto Rodríguez Quirós (1960–1979)
Román Arrieta Villalobos (1979–2002)
Hugo Barrantes Ureña (2002–2013)
José Rafael Quirós Quirós (2013– )

Auxiliary bishops
Ignacio Nazareno Trejos Picado (1968-1974), appointed Bishop of San Isidro de El General
Antonio Troyo Calderón (1979-2002)
Daniel Francisco Blanco Méndez (2017-

Other priests of this diocese who became bishops
Antonio del Carmen Monestel y Zamora, appointed Coadjutor Bishop of Comayagua, Honduras in 1915
Claudio María Volio y Jiménez, appointed Bishop of Santa Rosa de Copán, Honduras in 1916
Vicente Juan Solís Fernández, appointed Bishop of Alajuela in 1940
Alfonso Coto Monge, appointed Vicar Apostolic of Limón in 1980
José Francisco Ulloa Rojas, appointed Bishop of Limón in 1994
Oscar Gerardo Fernández Guillén, appointed Bishop of Puntarenas in 2003
José Manuel Garita Herrera, appointed Bishop of Ciudad Quesada in 2014
Javier Gerardo Román Arias, appointed Bishop of Limón in 2015
Manuel Eugenio Salazar Mora, appointed Bishop of Tilarán-Liberia in 2016
Mario Enrique Quirós Quirós (priest here, 1994-2005), appointed Bishop of Cartago in 2017

Territorial losses

See also
Catholic Church in Costa Rica
List of Roman Catholic dioceses in Costa Rica

References

External links
Arquidiocesis de San José Costa Rica official site (in Spanish)
 

San Jose de Costa Rica
San Jose de Costa Rica
San Jose de Costa Rica
1850 establishments in Costa Rica